Gerhard "Gerd" Müller (born 25 August 1955) is a German politician of the Christian Social Union in Bavaria who has served as Director General of the United Nations Industrial Development Organization since 2021.

He was German Federal Minister of Economic Cooperation and Development from 2013 to 2021.

From 1994 until 2021, Müller represented Oberallgäu in the Bundestag.

Political career 
Müller was chairman of the 's Bavarian section from 1987 until 1991. In this position, his calls in favour of capital punishment for drug dealers caused significant controversy.

Between 1989 and 1994, Müller was a Member of the European Parliament, where he served on the Committee on Transport and Tourism and on the Joint Assembly of the Agreement between the African, Caribbean and Pacific States and the European Economic Community (ACP-EEC).

From 1994 until 2021, Müller was a member of the German Parliament (Bundestag) for Oberallgäu. He served on the committees for foreign and defense policy and was the spokesman on Europe, foreign, and development policy for the CSU group.

Secretary of State at the Federal Ministry of Food, Agriculture and Consumer Protection, 2005–2013 
From 2005 to 2013, Müller served as Parliamentary State Secretary at the Federal Ministry of Food, Agriculture and Consumer Protection under ministers Horst Seehofer (2005–2008) and Ilse Aigner (2008–2013) in the first and second cabinets of Chancellor Angela Merkel. In this capacity, he was responsible for international relations, third-world development projects, and world food aid programs, among other issues. In 2011, he participated in the first joint cabinet meeting of the governments of Germany and China in Berlin; his counterpart in the Chinese government at the time was Han Changfu.

Following the 2013 federal elections, Müller was part of the CDU/CSU team in the negotiations with the SPD on a coalition agreement.

Federal Minister of Economic Cooperation and Development, 2013–2021 
Since 2013, Müller has been Federal Minister of Economic Cooperation and Development in the third cabinet of Chancellor Angela Merkel; he was succeeded as Parliamentary State Secretary by Peter Bleser.

In February 2014, Müller accompanied German President Joachim Gauck on a state visit to India – where they met with Prime Minister Manmohan Singh and Sonia Gandhi, among others – and to Myanmar.

In October 2014, Müller co-chaired the Berlin Conference on the Syrian Refugee Situation along with Foreign Minister Frank-Walter Steinmeier and the UN High Commissioner for Refugees, António Guterres. In November 2014, he and German Environment Minister Barbara Hendricks hosted a conference which raised $10 billion for the Green Climate Fund’s projects to fight global warming. During his term, the German government pledged €800 million (2016) and €1 billion (2019) in contributions to the Global Fund to Fight AIDS, Tuberculosis and Malaria.

In August 2015, Müller was part of Chancellor Merkel’s delegation to the first joint cabinet meeting of the governments of Germany and Brazil in Brasília. In January 2016, he participated in the first joint cabinet meeting of the governments of Germany and Turkey in Berlin.

In September 2020, Müller announced that he would not stand in the 2021 federal elections but instead resign from active politics by the end of the parliamentary term.

Director General of the United Nations Industrial Development Organization
While still serving as minister, the German government nominated Müller as its candidate for Director General of the United Nations Industrial Development Organization (UNIDO). In July 2021, he was selected over Bernardo Calzadilla Sarmiento (Bolivia) and Arkebe Oqubay (Ethiopia) by the organization's Industrial Development Board. This selection was confirmed by UNIDO's 19th General Conference in late 2021. Müller up the position in December 2021.

Political positions

Human rights and development 
In April 2014, Müller became the first member of Chancellor Angela Merkel's cabinet to publicly confront world football's governing body FIFA over its allocation of the 2022 FIFA World Cup to Qatar, criticizing that the choice contradicted global efforts to tackle climate change and that human rights breaches on the country's stadium construction sites even extended to "slave labor." Later that year, he publicly accused Qatar of funding Islamic State militants, arguing that the country was the "keyword" when it comes to IS financing.

In June 2017, Müller voted against Germany’s introduction of same-sex marriage.

International agriculture 
Müller is strongly in favor of extending subsidizing German agriculture for export, which he hopes will lessen the flow of refugees coming to Europe

Relations to the African continent 
Müller has in the past voted in favor of German participation in United Nations peacekeeping missions as well as in United Nations-mandated European Union peacekeeping missions on the African continent, such as in Somalia – both Operation Atalanta and EUTM Somalia – (2009, 2010, 2011, 2012, 2013, 2014, 2015 and 2018), Darfur/Sudan (2010, 2011, 2012, 2013, 2014, 2015, 2016, 2017 and 2018), South Sudan (2011, 2012, 2013, 2015, 2016 and 2017), Mali (2013, 2014, 2015, 2016, 2017 and 2018) the Central African Republic (2014), and Liberia (2015). He abstained from the vote on extending the mandate for Mali in 2016.

During an official visit in 2019, Müller described the slaughter of some 65,000 Herero and 10,000 Nama tribespeople in Namibia between 1904 and 1908 as genocide, one of the most senior government members to use the term while compensation claims were under discussion.

Other activities

Corporate boards
 KfW, Ex-Officio Member of the Board of Supervisory Directors

International organizations
 Joint World Bank-IMF Development Committee, Member
 Multilateral Investment Guarantee Agency (MIGA), World Bank Group, Ex-Officio Member of the Board of Governors (2013–2021)
 World Bank, Ex-Officio Member of the Board of Governors (2013–2021)

Non-profit organizations
 Welthungerhilfe, Chair of the Board of Trustees
 Kempten University of Applied Sciences, Member of the Board of Trustees
 Hanns Seidel Foundation, Member
  (DHV), President (2008-2012)

Recognition 
 World Food Programme’s Hunger Hero Award (2017)

Personal life 
Müller is Catholic and the father of two children.

References

External links 
 
  

1955 births
Living people
People from Günzburg (district)
Members of the Bundestag for Bavaria
Economic Cooperation ministers of Germany
Members of the Bundestag 2017–2021
Members of the Bundestag 2013–2017
Members of the Bundestag 2009–2013
Members of the Bundestag 2005–2009
Members of the Bundestag 2002–2005
Members of the Bundestag 1998–2002
Members of the Bundestag 1994–1998
Members of the Bundestag for the Christian Social Union in Bavaria